David Adams and Robbie Koenig were the defending champions of the doubles event of the Heineken Open tennis tournament, held in Auckland, New Zealand, but only Koenig competed that year with Petr Pála. Koenig and Pála lost in the first round to Jan-Michael Gambill and Brian MacPhie.

Mahesh Bhupathi and Fabrice Santoro won in the final 4–6, 7–5, 6–3 against Jiří Novák and Radek Štěpánek.

Seeds
Champion seeds are indicated in bold text while text in italics indicates the round in which those seeds were eliminated.

  Mahesh Bhupathi /  Fabrice Santoro (champions)
  Gastón Etlis /  Martín Rodríguez (quarterfinals)
  Jared Palmer /  Pavel Vízner (semifinals)
  Tomáš Cibulec /  Leoš Friedl (first round)

Draw

References

External links
 Doubles draw

2004 Heineken Open
Doubles